Pataudi is a town and one of the 4 sub-divisions of Gurugram district, in the Indian state of Haryana, within the boundaries of the National Capital Region of India. Ahirs/Yadav dominate the area.

Pataudi was the seat of Pataudi State which was ruled by the Nawabs of Pataudi. The 8th Nawab, Iftikhar Ali Khan Pataudi, played cricket for both England and India and captained the latter. His son Mansoor Ali Khan Pataudi, the 9th Nawab, also captained the Indian cricket team and has been described as one of "India's great cricket captains". The 10th and the current Nawab of Pataudi is actor Saif Ali Khan.

Satya Prakash Jravata is presently the MLA from Pataudi Constituency. Thakran Farms, an AgriTourism Destination, has come up in Pataudi promoting Agriculture and Rural Tourism. Thakran Farms is also developing India's largest hedge maze in 2.6 acres.

Pataudi Road is included as the new growth corridors in Gurugram. It takes only 30 minutes to reach Pataudi and is only 27 Kilometers from Gurugram city.

History
Pataudi was founded during the rule of Jalal-ud-din Khailji the Sultan of Delhi, (between 1290–1296) by a Mewati chieftain, Pata, who called it Patodhi.

The town was part of Pataudi State which was formed in 1804 by British East India Company by 40 villages and Pataudi town as reward to Faiz Talab Khan a Pashtun of the Barech tribe for aiding the Company against the Maratha Empire during the Second Anglo-Maratha War. Thus, Faiz Talab Khan is known as Nawab of Pataudi.

Pataudi became the part of Dominion of India later Republic of India in 1947 when British Raj ended. Former India cricket team captain Iftikhar Ali Khan Pataudi or Nawab of Pataudi Sr. remained ruler until 1952 then was succeeded by his son Mansoor Ali Khan Pataudi also former India cricket team captain until 1971 when 26th amendment to the Constitution of India, the Government of India abolished all official symbols of princely India, including titles, privileges, and remuneration. Their home Pataudi Palace is privately owned by the current titular Nawab Saif Ali Khan. Nearby Akbar Manzil, built after 1857 as the official residence of the then Nawab, was later converted into a kachehri (judicial complex), and is now used as a godown (store).

In 1984, a mob under the guidance of Indian National Congress' leader Lalit Maken set fire to Pataudi's Gurdwara which created a panic in the city. This came after Prime Minister of India Indira Gandhi was shot by her two Sikh bodyguards.

Geography 

It has an average elevation of 240 metres (787 feet). Pataudi is semi arid area and experiences low rainfall.

Demographics 
 India census, Pataudi had a population of 16,064. Males constitute 53% of the population and females 47%. Pataudi has an average literacy rate of 57%, lower than the national average of 59.5%: male literacy is 65%, and female literacy is 48%. In Pataudi, 17% of the population is under 6 years of age. Their main occupation is farming. Rao Kanwar Singh Yadav ( father of Krishan Lal Yadav and Ram Avtar Yadav ) the famous freedom fighter of Quni Daultabad village is also from Pataudi.

The Ahirs/Yadav dominate the area while the Rajputs constitute 12,000 with about equal number of Jats.

Real estate development

Pataudi Road is now is in the vicinity of three major highways like  National Highway 8 (India) and the upcoming Kundli–Manesar–Palwal Expressway and the proposed Dwarka Expressway. Manesar is just four kilometers from Pataudi Road. Several residential units coming up on the Pataudi Road, the logistics park, Special Economic Zones (SEZs) by Reliance, Raheja Engineering SEZ and a commercial sector.

Adding to this are the government's plans to upgrade infrastructure facilities along the belt. As per the new Gurugram-Manesar Master Plan 2021, the availability of land for development has opened up huge possibilities, mainly in the new sectors along Pataudi Road, slated to emerge as a growth corridor in the near future. A draft development plan for Pataudi town, too, is being prepared. It is expected to have about 4–5 sectors.

Pataudi Road is proposed to be widened to 135 meters. The sectors roads too would be at least 60 meters wide. Land Acquisition for creation of Residential Sectors ( Sector-1 Part-1 Pataudi )

The Gurugram Urban Estates Department had on 31 December 2013, issued notifications under Section 4 of the Land Acquisition Act, 1894, to acquire land for a proposed university in Sector 68, Gurugram (660 acre), Sector-1 Part-I, Pataudi (379 acre), Sector-1, Farrukhnagar (448.75 acre) and for public utilities from Sector 68 to 74 and Sector 99 to 115 (138.93 acre) and several acres for sector roads. Around 300 landowners were sent notices under Section 4 of the law expressing the intent to take over the land by the Bhupinder Singh Hooda government under this law, just a day before the new land acquisition act came into force.

The New Bharatiya Janata Party government headed by Manohar Lal Khattar decided to go ahead with the process. The 363 acres of land are spread across four villages.

Surely the farmers are opposing the acquisition process and registered the same with the Chief Minister. However, the acquisition process has the backing of Gurugram MP and a minister in Narendra Modi government, Rao Inderjit Singh who said "The acquisition will not be withdrawn as the process has already started. The state will develop residential sectors in this area. As far as the issue of Section 4 notices on the last day is concerned, it was legally tenable. There was nothing wrong."

Noticeable is the fact that The previous Hooda led Congress government-initiated land acquisition under a law which was due to be replaced the very next day. Landowners got notices dated 31 December 2013 whereas the Land Acquisition, Rehabilitation and Resettlement Act, 2013 came into effect on 1 January 2014.

The new law, the landowners said, will make them eligible for compensation of around Rs 2 crore per acre and 20% of the developed land. On the other hand, the British-era law granted nearly half of the compensation and no rights in developed land whatsoever. So basically, landowners are not outright against land acquisition --- they are ready to part with their land, albeit at a higher price.

The Administrator of Haryana Urban Development Authority Gurugram P.C. Meena, however, said that the rights of the landowners and farmers will be protected even if the notifications for land acquisition were issued under the old law and they would be given compensation at the enhanced rates as per the provisions of the new law.

New City in Pataudi

BJP  Government chief minister Manohar Lal Khattar announced a new city adjoining Gurugram in June 2018. In this, the area from Manesar towards Rewari and the area around Pataudi will be incorporated. The new city is likely to be spread across at least 50,000 hectares, which is larger than Chandigarh (11,400 hectares) but smaller than Gurugram (73,200 hectares). The city will come up in PPP mode. The other aspects of developing the city in a planned manner will be prepared by the consultant in the detailed master plan.” The proposed city will be well connected to neighbouring urban centres through national and state highways, the Kundli-Manesar-Palwal (KMP) Expressway and other major districts roads. The consultant is also expected to suggest the road network plan, metro rail plan, required rail and road linkages and public transportation for the proposed city and assess the proposed social, economic and physical infrastructure.

Transport 

Northern Peripheral Road commonly known as Dwarka Expressway road is being developed under the public-private partnership (PPP) model. This stretch will connect Dwarka with National Highway 8 at Kherki Dhaula and will pass Pataudi Road. The NPR stretch has been planned as an alternate link road between Delhi and Gurugram, and is expected to ease the traffic situation on the Delhi Gurugram Expressway. The road will also provide connectivity to the much-touted Reliance-HSIIDC SEZ besides the Garhi Harsaru dry depot.

Much like Delhi, Gurugram too will have a BRT corridor to decongest traffic on the Northern Peripheral Road. In several sections, the NPR will have provisions for the bus rapid transit (BRT) corridor to ensure smooth flow of traffic. The road will be fully developed in March 2012.

The KMP Expressway is the driving force behind the rise of Gurugram-Pataudi Road.

A new link road has been made by HUDA connecting Manesar with Patuadi road near Wazirpur village. The length of the road is 3.5 km.

Rail 

Pataudi Road railway station operated by Northern Railway of Indian Railways. The station is located between Haileymandi and Jatauli village, approximately 3 km from Pataudi and that forms a part of the larger Indian railways network, where trains connect Rewari to Delhi via Gurugram and other important cities in India like Jaipur, Ajmer, Jodhpur, Jaisalmer, Ahmadabad and Mumbai.

Villages in Pataudi

Haily Mandi-Khandewla-Khawaspur-Jamalpur-Ghoshgarh(Kera)
Babra Bakipur – Balewa – Bapas – Baraheri Rehnwa – Bas Padamka – Bhokhraka – Bhora Kalan – Bhora Khurd -Dhani Chitter Sain- Kumbhawas - Dhani Shankar Wali – Bhudhka – Bilaspur kalan – Brahmanwas – Brijpura – Chandla Durngarwas – Chhawan – Chhilarki – Dadawas – Darapur – Quni Daultabad – Devla Was – Dinokri – Fakarpur – Fazilwas – Gadaipur -Gawalier – Ghilnawas – Goriawas – Gudhana  – Hakdarpur – Haliaki – Hussainka – Heraheri – Inchhapuri – Janaula – Jasat – Jatauli-Jauri Khurd- Khalilpur – Khanpur – Khetiawas – khor – Kukrola – Langra – Lohchab – Lokera – Lokri – Mahniawas – Malikpur – Mangwaki – Mau – Mirzapur – Mozabad – Mujaffara- Mumtajpur – Nanu Khurd – Nanukalan – Narhera – Nurgarh – Nurpur – Pahari – Parasoli – Pathredi – Rajpura(8) – Rampur – Ransika – Rathiwas – Saiad Shah Pur – Shahpur Jat – Sherpur – Sidhrawali – Sluts – Tatarpur – Telpuri – Turkapur -Uncha Majra, Mangwaki(Noorgarh) ) Darapur)

See also
 Pataudi family

References

External links 

 Genealogy of the ruling chiefs of Pataudi
 Pataudi Real Estate

 
Cities and towns in Gurgaon district
Tehsils in Haryana
Populated places established in the 1290s